John Eugene Smith (1816-1897) was a Swiss immigrant to the United States, who served as a Union general during the American Civil War.

Early life
Smith was born in Bern, Switzerland, in 1816. His father had served under Napoleon Bonaparte and emigrated with his family to Philadelphia, Pennsylvania after the emperor's downfall. In Philadelphia, Smith was educated to be a jeweler and 20 years later settled in Galena, Illinois, where he practiced his jewelry trade. Smith was one of nine residents of Galena who would eventually become generals fighting for the Union during the Civil War. The other eight were: Augustus L. Chetlain, John O. Duer, Ulysses S. Grant, Jasper A. Maltby, Ely S. Parker, John A. Rawlins, William R. Rowley and John Corson Smith.

Civil War

When the Civil War began in 1861, Smith served as an aide de camp to Illinois Governor Richard Yates. On December 26, 1861 he was appointed colonel of the 45th Illinois Volunteer Infantry Regiment, with the rank backdated to July 23, 1861 to replace the previous Colonel who resigned his state Commission when the regiment entered Federal service. He led his regiment at the battles of Fort Henry, Fort Donelson and Shiloh. On November 29, 1862 he was promoted to brigadier general of U.S. Volunteers.  He briefly commanded a brigade before taking command of the 8th Division, XVI Corps.  When Ulysses S. Grant began his final campaign against Vicksburg, Smith was placed in command of the 1st Brigade, 3rd Division, XVII Corps.  He fought at the battles of Port Gibson, Raymond, Champion Hill and in the assaults on Vicksburg.  In June, 1863 in the midst of the siege of Vicksburg, Smith was chosen to replace Gen. Isaac F. Quinby in command of the 7th Division, XVII Corps after Quinby became ill and took a leave of absence.  In September, 1863 Smith was transferred to command the 2nd Division, XVII Corps and his division was sent with William T. Sherman to aid in the relief of Chattanooga.  During the battle of Missionary Ridge, Smith took part in the attacks against the Confederate right flank at Tunnel Hill.

In December, 1863 Smith took command of the 3rd Division, XV Corps which he would command until the end of the war.  He saw action during the Atlanta Campaign, March to the Sea and the Carolinas Campaign.

Later life
In 1866 General Smith was mustered out of the volunteer service, but chose to stay in the regular army.  He was appointed colonel of the 27th U.S. Infantry Regiment.  He received a promotion to brigadier general in 1867 and a brevet promotion to major general in 1869.

During this time, General Smith served along the frontier.  He was posted to command Fort Phil Kearney (following the Kearny Massacre in 1868), and played a vital role in renewing peaceful negotiations with Red Cloud and in overseeing the removal of troops from Fort Phil Kearney. He is described as "A favorite of Red Cloud's...[and] respected among the Sioux Indians." Afterwards he was chosen by Red Cloud to accompany the 1870 Sioux delegation to Washington, where he was photographed (along with other delegates) by famous documentary photographer Mathew Brady.

He retired from the army in 1881.

Smith resided in Chicago, Illinois during his final years of life and died there on January 29, 1897. He is buried in Galena.

See also

List of American Civil War generals (Union)
 Bibliography of the American Civil War
 Bibliography of Abraham Lincoln
 Bibliography of Ulysses S. Grant

References
Eicher, John H., & Eicher, David J., Civil War High Commands, Stanford University Press, 2001, .
Korn, Jerry, The Fight For Chattanooga: Chickamauga to Missionary Ridge, Time-Life Books, 1985

1816 births
1897 deaths
Union Army generals
Swiss emigrants to the United States
People from Bern
People of Illinois in the American Civil War
18th-century soldiers
Military personnel from Illinois